The following places in Quebec, Canada, are called Saint-Étienne:
Saint-Étienne-de-Beauharnois, Quebec
Saint-Étienne-de-Bolton, Quebec
Saint-Étienne-des-Grès, Quebec
Saint-Étienne-de-Lauzon, Quebec